Codakia punctata, common name the punctate codakia, is a species of saltwater clam, a marine bivalve mollusc in the family Lucinidae.

This species is found along the coast of Queensland, north Western Australia and Thailand.

References

Lucinidae
Molluscs described in 1758
Taxa named by Carl Linnaeus